Macrobrachium hancocki is a species of freshwater shrimp found from Costa Rica southwards to Colombia and on Cocos Island and the Galápagos Islands. The species primarily inhabits swamp waters, small streams and stagnant pools. This species was first described in 1958. ''

References

Palaemonidae
Freshwater crustaceans of South America
Crustaceans described in 1950
Taxa named by Lipke Holthuis